Claude Savoie may refer to: 
Claude Savoie (politician), Canadian politician.
Claude Savoie (policeman), Canadian policeman.